The White Swan is a Grade II listed public house at  Twickenham Riverside in the London Borough of Richmond upon Thames.

It was built in the 18th century, and the architect is not known.

References

External links
Official website

1700s establishments in England
Commercial buildings completed in the 18th century
Grade II listed buildings in the London Borough of Richmond upon Thames
White
Pubs in the London Borough of Richmond upon Thames
Twickenham